Olivia Baker may refer to:
 Olivia Baker (weightlifter) (born 1979), New Zealand Olympic weightlifter
 Olivia Baker (runner) (born 1996), American middle-distance runner